Allard is a French and English surname. 
The surname is derived from the given name Adelard.

Allard may refer to:

People 

 Bill Allard (born 1937), photographer
 Carole-Marie Allard (born 1949), Canadian politician
 Christian Allard (born 1964), Scottish politician
 Don Allard (1936–2002), American college and Professional Football player
 Eudore Allard (1915–2001), Canadian politician
 Félix Allard (1897–1974), Canadian politician and lawyer
 France Allard (1963-2020), French astronomer
 Frédéric Allard (born 1997), Canadian ice hockey player
 Geoffrey Allard (1912–1941), Battle of Britain Fighter Ace
 J Allard (born 1969), American computer businessman
 Jean-François Allard (1785–1839), French soldier and adventurer
 Jean-Guy Allard (born 1948), Canadian journalist
 Jean René Allard (1930–2020), Canadian politician
 Jean Victor Allard (1913–1996), Canadian general
 Kolby Allard, baseball player
 Marie Allard (1738–1802), French dancer
 Maurice Allard (1922–1988), Canadian politician, law professor and lawyer
 Michèle Allard, former French figure skater
 Nicholas Allard (born 1952), American Dean and President of Brooklyn Law School
 Peter Allard, QC, founder of Allard & Co
 Robert W. Allard (1919–2003), American geneticist
 Sydney Allard (1910–1966), English founder of Allard Motor Company
 Tracy Allard (born 1970/1971), Canadian politician
 Wayne Allard (born 1943), member of the Republican Party and former United States Senator

In fiction 
 Kent Allard, pulp magazine character as The Shadow

See also 
 Alard (surname)
Ballard (surname)
Callard (surname)
Hallard (surname)
Gallard (surname)
Mallard (surname)
Ollard
Tallard

References 

French-language surnames
English-language surnames
Surnames of French origin
Surnames of British Isles origin

de:Allard
fr:Allard (homonymie)
nl:Allard